Black-ish (stylized as black·ish) is an American sitcom television series created by Kenya Barris. It aired on ABC from September 24, 2014, to April 19, 2022, running for eight seasons. Black-ish follows an upper class black family led by Andre "Dre" Johnson (Anthony Anderson) and Rainbow Johnson (Tracee Ellis Ross). The show revolves around the family's lives, as they juggle several personal and sociopolitical issues. The show also features the characters Zoey Johnson (Yara Shahidi), Andre Johnson, Jr. (Marcus Scribner), Jack Johnson (Miles Brown), and Diane Johnson (Marsai Martin).

In later seasons, the characters of Josh Oppenhol (Jeff Meacham), Ruby Johnson (Jenifer Lewis), Charlie Telphy (Deon Cole), Leslie Stevens (Peter Mackenzie), Devante Johnson (August and Berlin Gross) and Olivia Lockhart (Katlyn Nichol) were promoted to series regulars, while the character of Earl Johnson (Laurence Fishburne) makes recurring appearances.

Throughout its run, Black-ish received positive reviews. The show received Emmy and Golden Globe nominations for Outstanding Comedy Series, and a TCA Award for Outstanding Achievement in Comedy. Meanwhile, Tracee Ellis Ross has received individual praise, winning the Golden Globe Award for Best Actress.  The show also ranks relatively highly among shows broadcast by ABC in terms of television season ratings, and ranks among the top ten in the United States for estimated total audience size.

In May 2020, ABC renewed the series for a seventh season, which premiered on October 21, 2020. Ahead of its seventh season premiere, an hour-long Election-themed special was aired on October 4, 2020. In May 2021, ABC renewed the series for an eighth and final season, which premiered on January 4, 2022, and consists of 13 episodes. The series finale aired on April 19, 2022.

The show's success also prompted a spin-off titled Grown-ish, which stars Shahidi as her character travels to college. In May 2019, ABC ordered a short-lived prequel series, Mixed-ish, centered on young Bow and her biracial family in the 1980s.

Cast and characters

Main cast

 Anthony Anderson as Andre "Dre" Johnson: a wealthy advertising executive at Stevens & Lido, who wishes to ensure a balance of black culture is intertwined with his family's upper middle class, ultra-suburban upbringing. Rainbow's husband. Dre cares about his reputation, his favorite child is Zoey, and he is infamous for his shopping problem, particularly with shoes. He has trouble bonding with Junior. He is often bullied for his race at work. Andre has a strong bond with his mother.
 Tracee Ellis Ross as Dr. Rainbow "Bow" Johnson: an anesthesiologist and Andre's wife, who wishes to retain a place in her children's lives. She comes from a bi-racial family where her father is white and her mother is African-American. She typically has the strongest bond with Junior. She often finds Dre’s ideas to be absurd.
 Yara Shahidi as Zoey Johnson (starring seasons 1–3; recurring seasons 4–8): Andre and Rainbow's oldest child, Dre’s favorite child. She is a stereotypical teenage girl, caring mostly about looks, boys, however, is responsible. Shahidi left the main cast at the end of season 3 to star in her own spin-off series Grown-ish.
 Marcus Scribner as Andre "Junior" Johnson Jr.: Andre and Rainbow's self-proclaimed "nerdy" second oldest child. He typically lacks teenage savvy, but is very smart and is taught these things, albeit with a hint of disdain, by his relatively shallow and self-aggrandizing father and siblings. He has a strong bond with his mother. He dates Megan from seasons 3–4 and Olivia from seasons 6–8.
 Miles Brown as Jackson "Jack" Johnson: Dre and Rainbow's third oldest child and fraternal twin of Diane. He is 13-years-old and typically aloof, but also idolizes his father, and is Diane's younger twin brother. He relies on his cuteness despite his lack of intelligence in the earlier seasons. 
 Marsai Martin as Diane Johnson: Andre and Rainbow's youngest daughter and fraternal twin of Jack, who considers herself smarter and more mature than him. She is often considered evil by her family and friends, bullying everyone she knows, particularly Charlie.
 Jenifer Lewis as Ruby Johnson (starring seasons 2–8; recurring season 1): Andre's mother, who does not get along with Rainbow. She is heavily religious and pro-black on several issues. She shares many traits with Diane, and has a strong bond with Andre.
 Jeff Meacham as Josh Oppenhol (starring seasons 2 and 6–8; recurring seasons 1 & 3–5): Andre's co-worker, who is often disrespected and undervalued by his peers, and is often racist.
 Peter Mackenzie as Leslie Stevens (starring seasons 3–8; recurring seasons 1–2): Andre's boss and co-owner of Stevens & Lido, who engages in hipster racism and provides implicit bias in regards to social issues.
 Deon Cole as Charlie Telphy (starring seasons 4–8; recurring seasons 1–3): Dre's eccentric co-worker and adulthood best friend. Cole also features as part of the main cast of Grown-ish. Charlie is very mysterious, such as having two families, and his character has many inconsistencies. He often forgets about his son, Eustace. He is divorced.
 August and Berlin Gross as DeVante Johnson (starring seasons 4–8; guest season 3, mentioned season 2): Andre and Rainbow's youngest child who appears from season 3 onwards. Rainbow found out she was pregnant with him in "Daddy Dre-Care". He is born in the episode "Sprinkles".
 Katlyn Nichol as Olivia Lockhart (starring seasons 7–8; guest season 6): Junior's girlfriend. They had a close to serious relationship for about 2 years, until Olivia broke up with Junior towards the end of the series.

Recurring cast

 Laurence Fishburne as Earl "Pops" Johnson: Dre's father and Ruby's ex husband who lives with the Johnsons
 Anna Deavere Smith as Alicia Johnson: Rainbow, Santamonica and Johan's widowed mother 
 Nelson Franklin as Connor Stevens: Leslie Stevens' son who works at Stevens & Lido
 Beau Bridges as Paul Johnson: Rainbow, Santamonica and Johan's late father
 Raven-Symoné as Rhonda Johnson: Dre's sister 
 Nicole Sullivan as Janine: The Johnsons' neighbor
 Wanda Sykes as Daphne Lido: The wife of Stevens & Lido's founding partner who takes over as co-owner
 Allen Maldonado as Curtis
 Catherine Reitman as Lucy
 Daveed Diggs as Johan Johnson: Rainbow and Santamonica's brother
 Rashida Jones as Santamonica Johnson: Rainbow and Johan's sister
 Quvenzhané Wallis as Kyra
 Issac Ryan Brown as Young Dre
 Faizon Love as Sha: Dre's childhood best friend
 Jennie Pierson as Ms. Davis
 Emerson Min as Mason

Episodes

Production

Development and casting
Black-ish first appeared on the development slate at ABC in October 2013, when it was reported that the project, which would star Anthony Anderson, had received a script commitment. On January 16, 2014, ABC greenlit the pilot episode. Two weeks later, Larry Wilmore joined the show as showrunner. In mid-February, Laurence Fishburne was cast as the father of Anderson's character, and Tracee Ellis Ross signed on as the female lead.

Filming
On May 8, 2014, ABC picked up the pilot to the series for the 2014–15 television season. A few days later, Anderson announced that Larry Wilmore would be stepping down as showrunner early in the show's run due to his forthcoming late night show, The Nightly Show with Larry Wilmore.

On May 7, 2015, ABC renewed the series for a second season. On March 3, 2016, ABC renewed the series for a third season. On May 10, 2017, ABC renewed the series for a fourth season. On May 11, 2018, ABC renewed the series for a fifth season. On December 14, 2018, ABC picked up 2 additional episodes for the fifth season bringing the season total to 24 episodes. On May 2, 2019, ABC renewed the series for a sixth season. On May 21, 2020, ABC renewed the series for a seventh season. On October 23, 2020, ABC picked up 6 additional episodes for the seventh season bringing the season total to 21 episodes. On May 14, 2021, ABC renewed the series for an eighth and final season.

Reception

Nielsen ratings

Critical response

Black-ish has been met with generally positive reviews from critics. Rotten Tomatoes gives season 1 an approval rating of 86% based on 56 reviews, with an average rating of 7.3/10. The site's consensus states, "Although it seems uncertain of its target audience, Black-ish ingratiates with a diverse cast and engaging cultural issues." Metacritic gave season 1 a weighted average score of 77 out of 100, based on 31 critics, indicating "generally favorable reviews". Rolling Stone′s December 4, 2014, issue called it "one of the only new network comedies worth watching," praising in particular Laurence Fishburne's performance.

On Rotten Tomatoes, season 4 holds an approval rating of 100% based on 11 reviews, with an average rating of 8.67/10. The site's consensus states, "black-ish continues to push boundaries, but with a much more celebratory tone that seeks to educate as readily as it entertains."

As of the spring 2022, both the acting performances of lead actor Anthony Anderson, and lead actress Tracee Ellis Ross have been met with critical acclaim. Anderson has earned 6 Primetime Emmy Award for Outstanding Lead Actor in a Comedy Series nominations for the role of Andre Johnson, while Ross has earned 5 Primetime Emmy Award for Outstanding Lead Actress in a Comedy Series nominations for playing Dr. Rainbow Johnson.

Accolades

Spin-offs

Grown-ish

The twenty-third episode of the third season, "Liberal Arts", functioned as a backdoor pilot for a proposed spin-off of the same title, starring Yara Shahidi as her character, Zoey Johnson, goes to college away from the family. Other cast members in the pilot and proposed series were Chris Parnell, Mallory Sparks, Matt Walsh, and Trevor Jackson.

In early May 2017, ABC passed on the pilot, but its sister channel Freeform commenced negotiations to move the project there. On May 19, 2017, Freeform officially ordered 13 episodes of the spin-off, now under the tentative title College-ish. In August 2017, the series changed its title to Grown-ish, and added Francia Raisa, Jordan Buhat and Chloe x Halle as cast members. The series's pilot premiered on January 3, 2018. Parnell and Jackson reprised their roles from the backdoor pilot, while Emily Arlook was also added as Nomi, replacing the character Miriam played by Mallory Sparks.

Mixed-ish

On May 2, 2019, it was announced that a second spin-off, now titled Mixed-ish had been ordered to series by ABC. In lieu of this, the May 7 episode of season five would be shelved until next season. The episode, titled "Becoming Bow", would follow a young Bow and her family. The series was renewed for a second season on May 21, 2020. In May 2021, the series was canceled after two seasons.

Old-ish 
It was announced in September 2020 that a new spin-off starring Laurence Fishburne and Jenifer Lewis was in the works. However, in May 2021, ABC Entertainment president, Craig Erwich, stated there were no plans for the pilot.

Notes

References

External links
 
 

 
2010s American black sitcoms
2020s American black sitcoms
2010s American comedy television series
2020s American comedy television series
2010s American single-camera sitcoms
2020s American single-camera sitcoms
2014 American television series debuts
2022 American television series endings
American Broadcasting Company original programming
English-language television shows
Mass media portrayals of the upper class
Television series by ABC Studios
Television shows set in Los Angeles
Television series about families
Television shows featuring audio description
Television Academy Honors winners